Rhyzodiastes denticauda is a species of ground beetle in the subfamily Rhysodinae. It was described by R.T. Bell and J.R. Bell in 1985. It is found in Sarawak (Malaysian Borneo).

Rhyzodiastes denticauda measure  in length.

References

Rhyzodiastes
Beetles of Asia
Insects of Malaysia
Endemic fauna of Malaysia
Endemic fauna of Borneo
Beetles described in 1985